Tannerite is a brand of binary explosive targets used for firearms practice and sold in kit form. The targets comprise a combination of oxidizers and a fuel, primarily aluminium powder, that is supplied as two separate components that are mixed by the user. The combination is relatively stable when subjected to forces less severe than a high-velocity bullet impact. A hammer blow, the product being dropped, or impact from a low-velocity bullet or shotgun blast will not initiate a reaction. It is also designed to be non-flammable (the reaction cannot be triggered by a burning fuse or electricity), although its explosion can ignite flammable material.

Because it is sold as separate components which are not themselves explosive, it is not regulated by the U.S. Bureau of Alcohol, Tobacco, Firearms, and Explosives (ATF), and can be transported and sold in many places without the legal restrictions that  apply to explosives. The term tannerite is often used to refer to the mixture itself, and other reactive targets and combination explosives are often generically referred to as tannerite.

Uses
Tannerite brand targets explode when shot by a high-velocity bullet. Low-velocity bullets and shotgun ammunition will not initiate a reaction.

The explosive reaction, once initiated, occurs at a very high velocity, producing a large vapor cloud and a loud report. It is marketed as a target designation that is useful for long-range target practice: the shooter does not need to walk down-range to see if the target has been hit, as the target will react and serve as a highly visible indicator.

Binary explosives like Tannerite are also used in some business applications, including commercial blasting, product testing, and special effects. Tannerite offers a "boom box" kit which includes colored powder for gender reveal parties.

Target composition and sale
Tannerite targets are sold in pre-sized quantities. The package includes two containers. An oxidizer composition is contained within one of the containers and a catalyst composition is contained within the other.

The product, developed by Daniel Jeremy Tanner, and initially formulated in 1996, consists of two components: a fuel mixed with a catalyst or sensitizer, and a bulk material or oxidizer. The fuel/catalyst mixture is 90% 600-mesh dark flake aluminium powder, combined with the catalyst that is a mixture of 5% 325-mesh titanium sponge and 5% 200-mesh zirconium hydride (with another patent document listing 5% zirconium hydroxide). The oxidizer is a mixture of 85% 200-mesh ammonium nitrate and 15% ammonium perchlorate. The patents on these formulations were applied for on August 20, 2001.

United States law 

As Tannerite is supplied as components, not themselves explosive, combining the components to constitute an explosive is regulated by laws on manufacturing explosives.
In the United States, the Bureau of Alcohol, Tobacco, Firearms and Explosives advises: "Persons manufacturing explosives for their own personal, non-business use only (e.g., personal target practice) are not required to have a Federal explosives license or permit." However, "persons falling into certain categories are prohibited from possessing explosive materials". Those prohibited from possessing explosives include most non-citizens, unlawful drug users and addicts, those convicted or indicted for serious crimes, fugitives, and those who have been officially declared mentally defective or have been committed to a mental institution. There are also restrictions at state and local level. For example, in California a permit may be required to use or possess Tannerite.

Various regulations also govern the storage of unmixed explosives. As oxidizers and combustibles, there are some restrictions in the United States on shipping of the unmixed components.

Notable incidents
The man was on probation when he mixed and shot the Tannerite and was not allowed to possess firearms or explosives.

Multiple other sounds of explosions were also reported in the incident. The explosive noise caused numerous phone calls to the Chautauqua County Sheriff's Office, the New York State Police, and other law enforcement in the area.

The September 2016 New York and New Jersey bombings involved improvised explosive devices that contained "a compound similar to a commercial explosive known as Tannerite", set off by a small charge of unstable hexamethylene triperoxide diamine, which served as a detonator for the highly stable ammonal-type secondary charge.

An unnamed person suffered "injuries typical of blast injury, such as tympanic membrane rupture, globe injury, and severe burns" due to "close proximity exposure to detonation of the mixed Tannerite blend".

On April 23, 2017, Dennis Dickey, an off-duty U.S. Border Patrol agent, shot a Tannerite target in a gender reveal celebration on state trust land south of Tucson, Arizona, which accidentally ignited the nearby dry brush and started a  fire known as the Sawmill Fire. By the time the wildfire was mostly contained one week later, it had jumped over the Santa Rita Mountains and crossed State Route 83, spreading into the historic Empire Ranch and the surrounding  Las Cienegas National Conservation Area. The estimated damage caused by the blaze was $8.19 million. Dickey pleaded guilty in September 2018 to a misdemeanor violation of U.S. Forest Service regulations and was sentenced to five years' probation. He also was ordered to pay restitution, with an initial payment of $100,000 (taken from his retirement fund) and monthly payments of $500 per month thereafter for 20 years unless his income changes significantly. The payments will total $220,000 over the 20 years, after which the case will return to a judge to make a decision about future restitution. The eventual restitution payments could hypothetically be up to $8,188,069.

On April 23, 2021, another gender reveal party involved  of Tannerite detonated at the bottom of a quarry in Kingston, New Hampshire, rattling homes in not just New Hampshire but also parts of north-eastern Massachusetts. Although no one was injured, some homes experienced damaged foundations and water from the faucet briefly turned brown. The person who purchased and detonated the Tannerite turned himself in to Kingston police.

References

Binary explosives